The 1700th Air Transport Group is an inactive United States Air Force unit. Its last was assigned to the Continental Division, Military Air Transport Service, stationed at Kelly Air Force Base, Texas. It was inactivated on 1 May 1957.

History
Established at Kelly Field after World War II concurrently with the establishment of the Military Air Transport Service Continental Division Headquarters. With Material Command's large aircraft depot maintenance and supply facilities at Kelly, provided worldwide transport of supplies and equipment to all parts of the world. Operated large fleets of C-54s, C-97s and primarily C-124 Globemaster II transports, frequently forming transport squadrons then once trained and equipped would reassign them to new MATS organizations. During the 1950s, the 1700th operated most of the MATS transport aircraft as well as passenger aircraft.

Inactivated in May 1957 when Air Force Logistics Command became controlling organization at Kelly AFB, and MATS realigned its organization to focus more on overseas transports and the inactivation of its Continental Division.

Lineage
 Established as: 5th Air Transport Group (Provisional), 12 Jun 1947
 Disestablished on 1 Jun 1948
 Established as: 518th Air Transport Group, 1 Jun 1948
 Redesignated: 1700th Air Transport Group, 1 Oct 1948
 Inactivated on 1 May 1957

Assignments
 Domestic Wing, Air Transport Service, 12 Jun 1947 – 1 Jun 1948; 1 Jun 1948
 Continental Division, Military Air Transport Service, 1 Jul 1948 – 1 May 1957

Components
 33d Air Transport Squadron (Provisional), 12 June 1947 – 28 Jun 1948 (C-54)
 34th Air Transport Squadron (Provisional), 12 June 1947 – 28 Jun 1948 (C-54)
 Activated 10th Air Transport Squadron Assuming assets of 34th ATS(P), 1 Jun 1948 (C-54)
 Redesignated 1734th Air Transport Squadron, 1 Oct 1948 – 18 Sep 1953 (C-97)

 51st Air Transport Squadron (Provisional), 12 June 1947 – 1 Jun 1948 (C-54)
 Activated 8th Air Transport Squadron, Assuming assets of 51st ATS(P), 1 Jun 1948 (C-54)
 Redesignated 1255th Air Transport Squadron, 1 Oct 1948 – 23 Apr 1949 (C-54)

 52d Air Transport Squadron (Provisional), 12 June 1947 – 1 Jun 1948 (C-54)
 Activated 9th Air Transport Squadron, Assuming assets of 52d ATS(P), 1 Jun 1948 (C-54)
 Redesignated 1256th Air Transport Squadron, 1 Oct 1948 – 20 Jul 1952 (C-97)
 Activated 57th Air Transport Squadron, Assuming assets of 1256th ATS, 20 Jul 1952 – 1 May 1957 (C-54)

 1274th Air Transport Squadron, 25 Oct 1949 – 1 Aug 1952 (C-97)
 1262d Air Transport Squadron, 24 May 1950 – 20 Jul 1952 (C-97)
 Activated 55th Air Transport Squadron, Assuming assets of 1262d ATS, 20 Jul 1952 – 20 Oct 1953 (C-124)

 1275th Air Transport Squadron, 24 May 1950 – 20 Jul 1952 (C-97)
 Activated 56th Air Transport Squadron, Assuming assets of 1275th ATS, 20 Jul 1952 – 25 Mar 1954 (C-124)

 1280th Air Transport Squadron, 24 Oct 1951 (C-124)
 Redesignated 1286th Air transport Squadron, 7 Mar 1952 – 20 Jul 1952 (C-124)
 Activated 58th Air Transport Squadron, Assuming assets of 1286th ATS, 20 Jul 1952 – 30 Jun 1955 (C-124)

 1291st Air Transport Squadron, 24 Jul 1951 (C-124)
 Redesignated 1289th Air transport Squadron, 7 Mar 1952 – 20 Jul 1952 (C-124)
 Activated 76th Air Transport Squadron, Assuming assets of 1289th ATS, 20 Jul 1952 – 1 Feb 1956 (C-124)

 78th Air Transport Squadron, 14 Jul 1953 – 1 Jul 1955 (C-124)
 46th Air Transport Squadron, 18 Jul 1954 – 8 Apr 1956 (C-54)

Stations
 Kelly Field (later AFB), Texas, 12 Jun 1947 – 1 May 1957

Aircraft
 C-54 Skymaster, 1947–1948
 C-97 Stratofreighter, 1948–1952
 C-124 Globemaster II, 1952–1957
 C-118 Liftmaster, 1954–1956

References

 Mueller, Robert, Air Force Bases Volume I, Active Air Force Bases Within the United States of America on 17 September 1982, Office of Air Force History, 1989

Air transport groups of the United States Air Force
Four digit groups of the United States Air Force
Military units and formations in Texas